The Smith criterion (sometimes generalized Condorcet criterion, but this can have other meanings) is a voting systems criterion defined such that it's satisfied when a voting system always elects a candidate that is in the Smith set, which is the smallest non-empty subset of the candidates such that every candidate in the subset is majority-preferred over every candidate not in the subset. (A candidate X is said to be majority-preferred over another candidate Y if, in a one-on-one competition between X & Y, the number of voters who prefer X over Y exceeds the number of voters who prefer Y over X.)  The Smith set is named for mathematician John H Smith, whose version of the Condorcet criterion is actually stronger than that defined above for social welfare functions.  Benjamin Ward was probably the first to write about this set, which he called the "majority set".

The Smith set is also called the top cycle. The term top cycle may be somewhat misleading, however, since the Smith set can contain candidates that do not cycle. For examples, when there is a Condorcet winner it doesn't cycle with any alternatives, and when the Smith set consists only of two alternatives that tie pairwise, the two do not cycle with any alternatives.

Determination
The Smith set can be calculated with the Floyd–Warshall algorithm in time Θ(n3) or Kosaraju's algorithm in time Θ(n2).

Example
When there is a Condorcet winner—a candidate that is majority-preferred over all other candidates—the Smith set consists of only that candidate. Here is an example in which there is no Condorcet winner:
There are four candidates: A, B, C and D.
40% of the voters rank D>A>B>C.
35% of the voters rank B>C>A>D.
25% of the voters rank C>A>B>D.
The Smith set is {A,B,C}. All three candidates in the Smith set are majority-preferred over D (since 60% rank each of them over D). The Smith set is not {A,B,C,D} because the definition calls for the smallest subset that meets the other conditions. The Smith set is not {B,C} because B is not majority-preferred over A; 65% rank A over B. (Etc.)

In this example, under minimax, A and D tie; under Smith/Minimax, A wins.

In the example above, the three candidates in the Smith set are in a "rock/paper/scissors" majority cycle: A is ranked over B by a 65% majority, B is ranked over C by a 75% majority, and C is ranked over A by a 60% majority.

Other criteria

Any election method that complies with the Smith criterion also complies with the Condorcet criterion, since if there is a Condorcet winner, then it is the only candidate in the Smith set. Obviously, this means that failing the Condorcet criterion automatically implies the non-compliance with the Smith criterion as well.  Additionally, such sets comply with the Condorcet loser criterion. This is notable, because even some Condorcet methods do not (Minimax).  It also implies the mutual majority criterion, since the Smith set is a subset of the MMC set.

The Smith set and Schwartz set are sometimes confused in the literature. Miller (1977, p. 775) lists GOCHA as an alternate name for the Smith set, but it actually refers to the Schwartz set.  The Schwartz set is actually a subset of the Smith set (and equal to it if there are no pairwise ties between members of the Smith set).

Complying methods

The Smith criterion is satisfied by Ranked Pairs, Schulze's method, Nanson's method, the Robert's Rules method for voting on motions & amendments, and several other methods.

Methods failing the Condorcet criterion also fail the Smith criterion. Some Condorcet methods, such as Minimax, also fail the Smith criterion.

Voting methods that fail the Smith criterion can be modified to satisfy it (typically at the expense of other criteria). One approach is to apply the voting method to the Smith set only. (In other words, begin by deleting the candidates not in the Smith set from the votes.) For example, the voting method Smith/Minimax is the application of Minimax to the candidates in the Smith set. Another approach is to elect the member of the Smith set that is highest in the voting method's order of finish.

Examples

Minimax 
Mutual majority criterion#Minimax
The Smith criterion implies the Mutual majority criterion, therefore Minimax's failure to satisfy the Mutual majority criterion is also a failure to satisfy the Smith criterion. Observe that the set S = {A, B, C} in the example is the Smith set and D is the Minimax winner.

See also 
 Independence of Smith-dominated alternatives

References

J. H. Smith, "Aggregation of preferences with variable electorate", Econometrica, vol. 41, pp. 1027–1041, 1973.
Benjamin Ward, "Majority Rule and Allocation", The Journal of Conflict Resolution, Vol. 5, No. 4. (1961), pp. 379–389.

Electoral system criteria